The Brainies  is a puzzle game released on the Super Nintendo Entertainment System console and Atari ST, Amiga, Apple IIgs, Macintosh, and Amstrad CPC computers. Even though its European title is Tiny Skweeks, the connection to the popular Skweek series was made late.

Gameplay

The gameplay revolves around Mexican jumping beans (referred to in game as Brainies) as they navigate 101 levels to solve the puzzles that are in their way.

A time limit is in effect; running out of time means losing a life. Players can only control the direction in which a Brainy will walk; taking care not to bump into another Brainy or an obstacle. There are four difficulty levels and the object is to return the Mexican jumping beans safely home. Items can be picked up; they may be beneficial or detrimental to the Brainy depending on certain factors. Arrows can also force a Brainy to change directions, rendering him helpless for a while and possibly messing up a carefully solved puzzle.

Reception
GamePro gave the Super NES version a generally positive review, criticizing that "the icons are too small", but praising the brain-stretching and addictive gameplay.

The Super NES version of the video game was reviewed in one of the first 50 issues of Nintendo Power.

References

1991 video games
Amiga games
Amstrad CPC games
Atari ST games
DOS games
Puzzle video games
Single-player video games
Super Nintendo Entertainment System games
Titus Software games
Video games developed in France
Video games scored by Frédéric Motte
Virtual Studio games